Igreja de Nossa Senhora do Ó de Águas Santas is a church in Portugal. It is classified as a National Monument.

Churches in Porto District
National monuments in Porto District